Ali Baba, (1940 – 8 August 2016) was a renowned short story writer, novelist, poet and playwright of Sindhi including Urdu-language. He received awards for Pride of Performance  . He died on 8 August 2016 due to heart attack in his home Karachi.

Early life
Ali Baba's actual name was Ali Muhammad and he was born to Muhammed Ramzan Rind at Kotri, Jamshoro, Sindh, Pakistan in 1940. His parents migrated from Balochistan to Sehwan Sharif Sindh. Afterward they made Kotri as permanent residence. He got primary education from Nango line primary school Kotri and matriculation from Sher Dil Khan Municipal High school Kotri. His father served in railway department. He also served as clerk but resigned. Later he joined as Assistant Manager in a textile mill. He left this job as well. He started writing from 1965.

Notable works
He was notable for the following works:
Dharti Dhikana
Mohenjo Daro
Dungi Manjh Darya

Death
He died on 8 August 2016 in Karachi.

References

1940 births
2016 deaths
Pakistani novelists
Pakistani television writers
People from Jamshoro District
Sindhi-language writers